Saturated spectroscopy is the method by which the exact energy of the hyperfine transitions within an atom can be found. When a monochromatic light is shone through an atom, the absorption cross-section is broadened due to Doppler broadening.  Saturated spectroscopy allows the doppler broadened peak to be resolved so that the exact transitions can be found.

More than a decade after the first demonstration of spectral hole burning (or Lamb dip, a result of saturated absorption process) inside HeNe laser cavity at 1.1 μm in 1962, the greater majority of SA spectroscopy research was carried out with gas lasers and molecules in the mid-infrared.

But because SA requires high laser intensity, and the gas molecules usually have widely spread strong absorption spectra only in the mid-IR, while compact widely tunable mid-IR lasers were slow to develop, the SA technique has not been widely used for molecular chemical analysis besides precision metrology, which only been limited to the isolated wavelengths of HeNe and CO2 lasers and limited number of molecules.

See also
 Saturated absorption spectroscopy

External links
Saturated Spectroscopy
hole burning by Bennett

Spectroscopy
Scattering, absorption and radiative transfer (optics)